Tire is a populous district, as well as the center town of the same district, in İzmir Province in western Turkey. By excluding İzmir's metropolitan area, it is one of the prominent districts of the province in terms of population and is largely urbanized at the rate of 55.8%. Tire district area neighbors the district areas of Selçuk (west) Torbalı (north-west), Bayındır (north) and Ödemiş (east), all part of İzmir Province, while to the south it is bordered by the districts of Aydın Province. The district area's physical features are determined by the alluvial plain of Küçük Menderes River in its northern part and in its south by the mountains delimiting the parallel alluvial valley of Büyük Menderes River flowing between Aydın and the Aegean Sea. There is a Jewish community.

Advantaged by its fertile soil and suitable climate, Tire district's economy largely relies on production and processing of agricultural products, especially of figs, cotton, corn and other grains, cash crops like tobacco and sesame, fruits like watermelons, cherries, peaches and grenadines and dry fruits like walnuts and chestnuts.

Tire center has an attractive old quarter with many impressive examples of Islamic architecture, and lively Tuesday and Friday markets, where the influence of the multicultural population of the surrounding villages can be observed. These two markets on two days of the week are famous across the larger region and among visitors on excursion and tourists for the handcrafted items found on sale and they attract a large customer base. A yearly event that also draws crowds to Tire is one of the liveliest and the most rooted (since 1403) celebrations in western Turkey of Nevruz Day on the third Sunday of every March.

A famous local speciality is Tire meatballs.

Etymology and history
Tire center is an ancient town and it had already acquired considerable importance under the rule of the Lydians, called Tyrrha (occasionally spelled Tarrha) at the time and lying in the middle of the road connection between the capital of Lydia and the prominent portuary center of Ephesus.

While there are various suggestions regarding its form, many sources affirm the existence of a fundamental association between the city of Tyrrha and King Gyges of Lydia, who founded Lydia's Mermnad dynasty in the 7th century BC and laid the grounds for the Lydian expansion in the 150 years that followed. Some scholars indicate in all certainty that here was his birthplace, others claim that he first ruled here or the town was founded either by the 7th-century king or a previous namesake. Etymological similarity between the name of the city and such designations as Tyrrhenia, Tyrrhenians and tyrant have also been pointed at or disputed.

The etymology of the name Tyrrha itself was suggested as being an indigenous Lydian language word and explained in terms relative to the English language word "tower".

Tire developed strong ties with the Ottoman capital and administration, both economically and in terms of its population make-up, especially after the 15th century, since Tire became a retreat where palace personnel, including members of the harem, were sent for their retirement days. Timur (Tamerlane) spent the winter of 1402/1403 based in Tire, after his defeat of the Ottoman forces at the Battle of Ankara, a span of time he used to capture Smyrna lower castle from the Knights of Rhodes, to acquire the city of İzmir fully for the Turks, and his stay here is also at the origin of Tire's noted Nevruz celebrations referred to above. From 1867 until 1922, Tire was part of the Aidin Vilayet of the Ottoman Empire.

Population and administration

The district of Tire has two larger towns which have their own municipality. These are; Tire center and the depending township of Gökçen. The municipality of Tire center is one of the oldest in Turkey, having been established in 1864, coming the ninth across the country in terms of its anteriority, and has today 16 urban wards, while Gökçen has three. The district counts 64 villages in all, mostly isolated settlements in the surrounding mountains or amid forests. Almost a quarter of the population of Tire village chose outside immigration in the last decade, which was reflected in a slight increase in population for Tire center but contributed to a fall in population of eight per cent in the district as a whole. In connection with the same trend, the district receives scanty immigration from outside.

The total number of residences in Tire district reach 36,873. A total number of 16,446 enterprises of all sorts are located in Tire district. Seven banks provide services through seven branches across the district. The number of students per teacher is 18 and the number of patients per doctor is 506.

Economy

Tire municipality's anteriority in terms of its date of constitution was reflected in a number of other fields, which indicates an interest in the region by investors of the late-19th century. A railway line built as a connection joining İzmir-Aydın railway started to be laid in 1893 and a 137 km line connecting Tire and its eastern neighbor Ödemiş to that main axis to the west, itself the very first line placed in the History of rail transport in Turkey, was completed in 1911. The Basmane-Tire Regional railway service now runs from İzmir.

Presently, the district's average per capita income situates Tire roughly in the middle among depending districts of İzmir Province. The investments made to date have yet fallen short of modifying the district's overall economic picture, despite easy access through Selçuk to the close İzmir-Aydın motorway and to Adnan Menderes International Airport thereof. Industrial activities in Tire are concentrated around two industrial zones, the larger one named Tire Organized Industrial Zone (TOSBİ) and the smaller and more locally focused one named Tire Small Industrial Site.

Tourism and related accommodation facilities are still underdeveloped and the accommodation facilities despite the city's potential in terms of cultural tourism and the number of beds available in Tire does not exceed a hundred.

Footnotes

External links

 
  
Tire image gallery with also pictures from the museum

Sources

 

Populated places in İzmir Province
Jewish communities in Turkey
Districts of İzmir Province